Amit Bhandari  (born 1 October 1978) is an Indian cricketer. Having made an forgettable debut in 2000, his performances in the 2001–02 season kept him within striking distance of being re-selected.

Bhandari's lack of pace is compensated by his aggressive bowling, which was demonstrated in the India A tour of England in 2003, where he became the top wicket-taker. Bhandari joins Lakshmipathy Balaji and Aavishkar Salvi in the search for a place in the Indian team.

He as a team selector was in the news on 11 February for being beaten up by some U-23 non selected players.

References

1978 births
Living people
Indian cricketers
India One Day International cricketers
North Zone cricketers
Delhi cricketers
Racket sportspeople from Delhi
Indian cricket coaches